Zalaszántó is a village in Zala County, Hungary. It is home to a large Buddhist stupa.

References

Populated places in Zala County